The 1934 Miami Hurricanes football team represented the University of Miami as a member of the Southern Intercollegiate Athletic Association (SIAA) in the 1934 college football season. The Hurricanes played their home games at Moore Park in Miami, Florida. The team was coached by Tom McCann, in his fourth and final year as head coach for the Hurricanes. Finishing the season with a 5–3–1 record, the Hurricanes were invited to play in the first edition of the post-season Orange Bowl. The Hurricanes lost, 26–0, to Bucknell.

Schedule

References

Miami
Miami Hurricanes football seasons
Miami Hurricanes football